Alexandros Kalogeris (born 14 May 1986) is a Greek professional footballer who plays as a defensive midfielder for Super League 2 club Apollon Pontus.

Career
Kalogeris signed a two-year contract with Panetolikos on 23 June 2013, after having spent three years playing for Veria.

On 15 January 2015, he signed with Aris.

References 
Profile at myplayer.gr
Profile at epae.gr

1986 births
Living people
Greek expatriate footballers
Football League (Greece) players
Delta Ethniki players
Gamma Ethniki players
Super League Greece players
Super League Greece 2 players
Cypriot First Division players
Panetolikos F.C. players
PAS Giannina F.C. players
Veria F.C. players
Aris Thessaloniki F.C. players
Nea Salamis Famagusta FC players
Apollon Pontou FC players
Greek expatriate sportspeople in Cyprus
Expatriate footballers in Cyprus
Association football midfielders
Footballers from Athens
Greek footballers